The men's road race at the 1937 UCI Road World Championships was the 11th edition of the event. The race took place on Monday 23 August 1937 in Copenhagen, Denmark. The race was won by Éloi Meulenberg of Belgium.

Final classification

References

Men's Road Race
UCI Road World Championships – Men's road race